Karim Kerkar (born 3 January 1977) is a professional footballer who currently plays for Ajman Club in the UAE Football League. Born in Givors, Rhône, France, he represented Algeria at international level.

Personal
Kerkar was born to a family of Algerian immigrants in the town of Givors in France. He is the older brother of Charlton Athletic midfielder Salim Kerkar and US Possession forward Farid Kerkar.

Career
French-born Kerkar, who represented Algeria at international level, started his career with Gueugnon before spending three years with Le Havre. In 2002, Kerkar tried his luck with Manchester City but failed to play in a three-month spell and moved to Qatar club Al-Siliya. Kerkar came back to Britain in 2004, spending a month with Scottish side Clyde, where his performances won him a short-term move to Dundee United. At the end of 2004, Kerkar decided to pursue his career elsewhere and moved to the United Arab Emirates with Dubai Club before moving on quickly to Al-Wahda.
Kerkar spent two weeks with St Mirren in September 2007 and subsequently agreed a contract, only to renege on it twenty-four hours later, causing manager Gus MacPherson to announce he was "frustrated and disappointed". MacPherson advised Kerkar had been made clear as to the club's feelings regarding the matter, with the manager's misery compounded when St Mirren were beaten 2-0 the following day by Dundee United - Kerkar's last Scottish club. Kerkar had been on trial with St Johnstone the month previously and also went back on his word to sign.

Kerkar returned to former club Dubai Club in early 2008.

On 14 June 2011 Kerkar signed a one-year contract with Ajman Club. On 16 October 2011 he made his league debut for the club, in the first week of the 2011-12 UAE Football League season.

Honours
Emirates Club
 UAE President Cup: 2010
 UAE Super Cup: 2010

References

External links
 
 
 
 

1977 births
Living people
People from Givors
Sportspeople from Lyon Metropolis
French sportspeople of Algerian descent
Algeria international footballers
Algerian footballers
Algerian expatriate footballers
French footballers
FC Gueugnon players
Le Havre AC players
Manchester City F.C. players
Clyde F.C. players
Dundee United F.C. players
Al Dhafra FC players
Dubai CSC players
Fujairah FC players
Ligue 1 players
Ligue 2 players
Scottish Football League players
Scottish Premier League players
Expatriate footballers in England
Algerian expatriate sportspeople in the United Arab Emirates
Algerian expatriate sportspeople in England
Expatriate footballers in Scotland
Expatriate footballers in the United Arab Emirates
Expatriate footballers in Qatar
Al-Sailiya SC players
Algerian expatriate sportspeople in Qatar
Emirates Club players
Ajman Club players
Al Dhaid SC players
Qatar Stars League players
UAE First Division League players
UAE Pro League players
Association football midfielders
Footballers from Auvergne-Rhône-Alpes
Algerian expatriate sportspeople in Scotland
French expatriate sportspeople in Qatar
French expatriate sportspeople in England
French expatriate sportspeople in Scotland